Eloise may refer to:

Eloise (given name)

Places
 Éloise, a commune in south-eastern France
 Lake Eloise, Florida, United States

Film and television
 Eloïse's Lover, a 2009 Spanish film released domestically as Eloïse
 Eloise (2016 film), an American thriller
 Eloise: The Animated Series, a 2006 animated TV comedy series
 "Eloise" (The Sopranos), an episode of the TV series The Sopranos
 "Eloise" (Playhouse 90), a 1956 television play on the series Playhouse 90
 Eloise Hawking, a character on the TV series Lost

Literature
 Eloise (books), a 1950s book series by Kay Thompson
 Eloise (1955 book), the first of the Eloise series of children's books
 Eloise Drew, a character in the Nancy Drew mystery series
 Eloise Midgen, a character in the Harry Potter universe
 Eloise Pritchart, a character in David Weber's Honorverse series of novels

Music
 Eloise of Lord T & Eloise, a crunk rap group from Memphis, Tennessee
 Eloise (album), a 1993 album by Arvingarna
 "Eloise" (Arvingarna song), 1993
 Eloise, an opera by Karl Jenkins
 "Eloise" (Paul Ryan song), 1968, composed by Paul Ryan and sung by his twin brother Barry
 "Eloise", a song by Kay Thompson in 1965

Other uses
 Hurricane Eloise, a 1975 Atlantic hurricane
Cyclone Eloise, a tropical cyclone that caused moderate damage in Mozambique.
 Eloise (psychiatric hospital), Wayne County, Michigan, United States
 Eloise Cemetery
 Eloise Copper Mine, eastern Australia

See also
 Sweet Eloise, a US Air Force B-29 bomber, see List of surviving B-29 Superfortresses
 Heloise (disambiguation)